The Úpa is a river in the Czech Republic and a left tributary of the river Elbe. It originates in the Giant Mountains at an elevation of 1,422 metres. It enters the Elbe near Jaroměř.

It flows through Pec pod Sněžkou, Mladé Buky, Trutnov, Úpice or Česká Skalice.

References

Rivers of the Hradec Králové Region